cAMP-dependent protein kinase catalytic subunit beta is an enzyme that in humans is encoded by the PRKACB gene.

cAMP is a signaling molecule important for a variety of cellular functions. cAMP exerts its effects by activating the protein kinase A (PKA), which transduces the signal through phosphorylation of different target proteins. The inactive holoenzyme of PKA is a tetramer composed of two regulatory and two catalytic subunits. cAMP causes the dissociation of the inactive holoenzyme into a dimer of regulatory subunits bound to four cAMP and two free monomeric catalytic subunits. Four different regulatory subunits and three catalytic subunits of PKA have been identified in humans. The protein encoded by this gene is a member of the serine/threonine protein kinase family and is a catalytic subunit of PKA. Three alternatively spliced transcript variants encoding distinct isoforms have been observed.

Interactions
PRKACB has been shown to interact with Ryanodine receptor 2 and Low affinity nerve growth factor receptor.

References

Further reading

EC 2.7.11